Odites kollarella is a moth in the family Depressariidae. It was described by Oronzio Gabriele Costa in 1832. It is found in Portugal, Spain, France, Italy, Croatia, Moldova and Greece, as well as on Corsica.

The wingspan is about 12.5 mm.

References

Moths described in 1832
Odites
Taxa named by Oronzio Gabriele Costa